Catende is a Brazilian municipality in the state of Pernambuco. Has an estimated population in 2020 of 43,340 inhabitants in a total area of 207.24 km2. The economy is based on the cultivation of sugarcane and the production of derived products (sugar and ethanol).  Catende used to boast the world's largest sugar mill.

Geography

 State - Pernambuco
 Region - Zona da mata Pernambucana
 Boundaries - Bonito  (N); Palmares  (E);  Maraial and Jaqueira  (S);  Belém de Maria  (W)
 Area - 206.92 km2
 Elevation - 168 m
 Hydrography - Una river
 Vegetation - Subperenifólia forest
 Climate - Hot tropical and humid
 Annual average temperature - 24.8 c
 Distance to Recife - 137 km

Economy

The main economic activities in Catende are based in industry, commerce and agribusiness especially sugarcane and cattle.

Economic Indicators

Economy by Sector

Health Indicators

References

Municipalities in Pernambuco